Cool Bananas is the first album by the New Zealand band DD Smash led by Dave Dobbyn, released in 1982. It entered  the charts at number 1, purely on tour exposure.

In 2015, as part of the 40th anniversary celebrations of the New Zealand Music Charts, Recorded Music NZ honoured Cool Bananas as being the first album by a New Zealand artist to debut at No.1 on the album chart.

Track listing

Awards
The album won Best Album at the 1982 New Zealand Music Awards. DD Smash won the same award the following year with their follow up live album, Live: Deep in the Heart of Taxes. The band also won top group of the year, and Dobbyn won Most Promising Male Vocalist and Top Male Vocalist.

Charts

Weekly charts

Year-end charts

References

DD Smash albums
1982 albums